Hebbar Iyengar or Hebbari Srivaishnava  is a caste of Hindu Brahmins of  Tamil and Kannada origin whose members follow the Visishtadvaita philosophy propounded by Ramanuja. They are found primarily in the Indian state of Karnataka especially in Southern Districts. 

Hebbar Iyengars speak a unique language known as Hebbar Tamil, which is a Kannadised version of Tamil. The Hebbar language is highly influenced by Kannada and uses many loan words from Kannada, Sanskrit and archaic Tamil Vocabulary.

As with other Iyengar communities, Hebbar Iyengars are also divided into two sub-communities of Vadakalai and Thenkalai based on the different emphases in religious literature. The Vadakalai community deems the Vedas, written in Sanskrit to be more important, while the Thenkalai community ascribes more importance to the Tamil scriptures. The vast majority of Hebbar Iyengars today are believed to belong to the Vadakalai sect, and similarly to other Hindu communities, Hebbar Iyengars are also classified based on their gotra, or patrilineal descent.

Hebbar Iyengars also display a mark on their forehead known as the Srivaishnava Urdhva Pundra as a caste mark like other Iyengar Communities in Tamil Nadu, Andhra Pradesh etc.

History 

The details of Hebbar Iyengar origin was published long back in the Hebbar Srivaishnava magazine called "Hebbar Kshema". A historical novel written by Smt. Neeladevi about the life of Ramanuja in Karnataka named "Dhanya" gives similar answers to the origin of Hebbar Srivaishnavas.

During the 12th Century CE, Ramanujacharya fled Tamil Nadu for the Hoysala Kingdom, escaping the persecution of Vaishnavas by the Chola King Kulothunga II. When he was in Thondanur (Kere Thonnur) near Melukote, a group of elderly Kannada Brahmins from Saligrama came to visit, and heard Ramanujacharya's discourse on Sri Vaishnava philosophy. Impressed by his preachings, they converted to Sri Vaishnavism, and became his followers. Ramanujacharya referred to this group of new disciples as Hebbar, a name derived from the Kannada, hebbu/hiridhu (meaning big), and haruva (meaning Brahman). 

It is believed that many Hebbar Iyengars of today are also descendants of Jains who converted from Jainism to Vaishnavism shortly after their monarch, Bitti Deva (Vishnuvardhana), the Hoysala king, circa 1140 CE.

The Hebbar Iyengar sect initially settled in a few villages, namely Bindiganavile, Kadaba, Nuggehalli, Nonavinakere, Shantigrama in the Hoysala Kingdom in present-day Southern Karnataka. Later they spread across various other villages in the region. Thus they have their Haath Perumal (Household Deity) in different places within these districts.

Since their ancestor's mother tongue was Kannada they still have the affliction towards Kannada. Gradually they learned to speak Tamil, mainly to learn the Alwars Divya Prabhandams which are the essential religious works which a Sri Vaishnava has to learn and recite.

Hebbar Iyengars study Kannada in schools as their first language and cannot read and write in Tamil by default, however, they can still seek further education and learn any other languages they choose. They read the Ramanuja's philosophical works and Alwars Divya Prabhandams that are translated into Kannada or English. However, they recite Naalayira Divya Prabandhams in temples in Karnataka forming Goshtis (Groups). They are also called Melnatu Iyengars as they are residing in the High Deccan plateau of Karnataka.

Demographics 
Hebbar Iyengars are mainly found in Bengaluru, Mysuru, Mandya, Tumkur, Hassan, Chikkamagaluru, Shivamogga, Chikkaballapura, Kolar and Chamarajanagar districts of Southern Karnataka.

Hebbar Iyengar diaspora is now found in many states within India, as well as in the UK, the USA, Singapore, Australia, and many other countries around the world.

Religious observances

Notable people 
Scientists 	
 Raja Ramanna (1925–2004), Indian Physicist, Nuclear Scientist. Awarded Padma Vibhushan in 1975 
 M. R. Srinivasan (b: 1930), Indian Nuclear Scientist. Awarded Padma Vibhushan in 2015
		
Writers and Poets 	
 Gorur Ramaswamy Iyengar (1904–1991), Kannada Writer. Awarded Sahitya Academy Award in 1981 	
 G. P. Rajarathnam (1909–1979), Kannada Poet, writer 	
 Nanjangud Tirumalamba (1887–1982), First Female Kannada Writer, publisher, Newspaper Editor. Karnataka Rajya Sahitya Academy honoured her in 1980

Politicians and Administrators 	
 H. V. R. Iyengar (1902–1978), 6th Governor of Reserve Bank of India and Member of Indian Civil Service. Awarded Padma Vibhushan in 1962

Film/Television Artists and Director	
 B. S. Ranga (1917–2010), Kannada Film director	
J. Jayalalithaa (1946-2016), Tamil Actress and Chief minister of Tamil Nadu.	
 Kalyan Kumar (1928–1999), Kannada Film Actor	
 Prithviraj (Kannada actor) (b: 1948), Kannada Film Actor	
 Vidya Murthy (b: 1956), Kannada TV Serial and Film Actress
 Vasundhara Das (b: 1977), Film Actress, Singer and Dancer
		 	
Musicians	
 Raghu Dixit (b: 1974) Indian Singer, Music Composer of Indian Ethnic Music
Philanthropist
 T.S. Champaknath (1926 - 2018) Founder Trustee Dharithree, Narasipura, Bengaluru
Sumitra Champaknath (1932- 2018)  Secretary Trustee, MLA High School, Malleshwaram, Bengaluru

References 

Kannada Brahmins
Tamil Brahmins
Social groups of Tamil Nadu
Social groups of Karnataka
Brahmin communities of Karnataka